Beltring railway station is on the Medway Valley Line in Kent, England, serving the village of Beltring. The station and all trains that call are operated by Southeastern.

History
Beltring station opened later than the others on the line (which had been opened in 1844): its opening date was 1 September 1909. The halt originally had platforms built of wooden sleepers. It originally had a freight siding; used for the forwarding of farm produce until 5 June 1961. The station was then named Beltring and Branbridges Halt. It consists of concrete platforms with shelters. It serves a predominantly rural area: the nearest settlements being the small villages of Beltring, Branbridges, Laddingford and East Peckham.

Facilities
Beltring station is unstaffed and facilities are limited. The station is fitted with a self-service ticket machine as well as modern help points on the platforms. Seated areas are available on both platforms and train information screens are provided for running information.

No regular buses stop outside the station although Arriva Southern Counties routes 6 & 6A to Maidstone and Tunbridge Wells and Go-Coach route 208 to Tonbridge both stop a short walk away on Branbridges Road.

Services
All services at Beltring are operated by Southeastern using  EMUs.

The typical off-peak service in trains per hour is:
 2 tph to  via 
 2 tph to  

On Sundays, the service is reduced to hourly in each direction.

Plans mooted in the mid-2000s to close Beltring station, or at least replace the existing services with a token service (such as one train a week in each direction) have been withdrawn.

References

External links

Borough of Maidstone
DfT Category F2 stations
Railway stations in Kent
Former South Eastern Railway (UK) stations
Railway stations in Great Britain opened in 1909
Railway stations served by Southeastern